Fort Meade is a United States military fort in Maryland.

Fort Meade may also refer to:

 Fort Meade, Florida, a city in Polk County, Florida, United States
 Fort Meade Historic District, in Fort Meade, Florida, United States
 Fort Meade, Maryland, a census-designated place (CDP) in Anne Arundel County, Maryland, United States
 Fort Meade (South Dakota), an historic United States cavalry fort near Sturgis, South Dakota, United States
 Fort Meade National Cemetery, a national cemetery near Sturgis, South Dakota, United States